Litipara Assembly constituency is an assembly constituency in the Indian state of Jharkhand.

Litipara Assembly constituency is part of Rajmahal (Lok Sabha constituency).

Overview
Litipara Assembly constituency covers: Litipara, Amrapara and Hiranpur Police Stations in Pakaur district; and Gopikandar Police Station in Dumka district.

This seat is reserved for Scheduled Tribes.

Litipara Assembly constituency is part of Rajmahal (Lok Sabha constituency).

Members of Legislative Assembly 
1990: Sushila Hansdak, Jharkhand Mukti Morcha.
1995: Sushila Hansdak, Jharkhand Mukti Morcha.
2000: Sushila Hansdak, Jharkhand Mukti Morcha.
2005: Sushila Hansdak, Jharkhand Mukti Morcha.
2009: Simon Marandi, Jharkhand Mukti Morcha
2014: Dr. Anil Murmu, Jharkhand Mukti Morcha
2017: Simon Marandi, Jharkhand Mukti Morcha, by poll
 2019: Dinesh William Marandi, Jharkhand Mukti Morcha,

See also
Littipara block
Amrapara block
Hiranpur block
Gopikandar
List of states of India by type of legislature

References

Assembly constituencies of Jharkhand